Bany may refer to:

People
 Banyingela Kasonga, also known as Bany
 Briana Bany, also known as Briana Banks (born 1979), German-American pornographic actress and model
 Ralph Bany (born 1964), German football player
 William Nyuon Bany (died 1996), Southern Sudanese politician

Places
 Bougoutoub-Bany, Senegal